The Kreuz Oranienburg (German:Autobahndreieck Kreuz Oranienburg)  is a partial cloverleaf with a semi-direct link in the German state Brandenburg in the Metropolitan region of Berlin.

The interchange connects the A111 from Dreieck Charlottenburg in Berlin and the B96 from Oranienburg to the A10, the Berlin Beltway.

Geography 
The interchange lies in the municipal areas of Leegebruch and Velten in the Landkreis Oberhavel. The nearby cities and villages are Oberkrämer, Oranienburg, Birkenwerder and Hohen Neuendorf. The interchange is approximately 25 km northwest of the centre of Berlin.

Near the interchange lies the nature reserve Naturpark Barnim and the river Havel, that is crossed by both motorways.

History 
The interchange was opened is 1982 as a trumpet. In the early 21st century the B 96 coming from the Oranienburg-bypass had also to be linked to the Berlin beltway A10. To make this connection, a new cloverleaf was built east of the existing interchange. The old interchange is due to the cloverleaf only a connection from and to the west, the eastbound relation is completely taken over by the cloverleaf. Through the old narrow east-south trumpet bend which is still visually present, the gradient of the south-west relation is unusual.

Manual  traffic count near the interchange

References 

Oranienburg